Colonel John Donald Hamill Stewart, CMG
(15 October 1845 – 26 September 1884) was a British soldier. He accompanied General Gordon to Khartoum in 1884 as his assistant. He died in September 1884 attempting to run the blockade from the besieged city at the hands of the Manasir tribesmen and followers of Muhammad Ahmad Al-Mahdi.

Military career 
Stewart was appointed a Cornet in the British 11th Hussars in 1865. In 1882 Lieutenant Colonel Stewart was instructed to prepare a report on the Sudan where Muhammad Ahmad Al-Mahdi was defying the Egyptian Government with success. After a journey to Khartoum and return to Egypt the "Report on the Soudan" (1883) was finished.

He returned with Gordon as second-in-command on his journey to Khartoum commencing with departure from Victoria station in February 1884. Wounded during the siege, Stewart led an attempt to break the blockade aboard the Steamer Abbas in September 1884, along with the British consul Frank Power (who was also the correspondent from The Times), the French consul Léon Herbin, and other residents of Khartoum. The attempt failed when the Abbas ran aground on a rock near Abu Hamad. All passengers and crew were killed by Arab tribes ashore. Gordon learned of this a few weeks later when he received a letter from the Mahdi that quoted from letters that Stewart had been carrying with him on the Abbas.

Legacy

Richard Johnson portrayed Stewart in the film Khartoum.

References

Bibliography

Hill, Richard. (1967). A Biographical Dictionary of the Sudan. London: Frank Cass & Co

External links
Stewart's History with the 11th Hussars
Gordon of Khartoum

1845 births
1884 deaths
British Army personnel of the Mahdist War
11th Hussars officers
British military personnel killed in the Mahdist War 
Companions of the Order of St Michael and St George
Military personnel from Dublin (city)